Avraham "Avi" Cohen (born 12 June 1962) is an Israeli former footballer who played as a right back. He is often referred as Avi Cohen II or Avi Cohen of Jerusalem to distinguish himself from the player of the same name, born in 1956.

Career
Cohen began his career at Beitar Jerusalem, initially as a striker, but moved back to the right back position. Because of this, he was noted for his attacking skills, and was one of the first players in Israel to adopt the style of the attacking defender. He left Beitar in 1985 to join Maccabi Sha'arayim, but returned a season later. He would remain there until the summer of 1989, where he was signed by Maccabi Tel Aviv.

It was at Maccabi where he would be known as Avi Cohen of Jerusalem, as Avi Cohen became his teammate (albeit briefly, as he would leave to join Maccabi Netanya the following year). In his first two seasons, he scored three and six times respectively, but in the 1991–92 season, his goalscoring prowess really came to the fore. Maccabi won the title for the first time in twelve years, and Cohen scored twenty goals in all competitions (18 in the league, 2 in the State Cup), winning the Footballer of the Year award later that year. In the 1992–93 season, Maccabi would lose the title to Cohen's previous club, Beitar, but still won silverware, in the form of the Toto Cup. Cohen won the State Cup in 1994, the only trophy that had eluded him up to that point. He still maintained his better than average goal scoring total for a defender, with eight in all competitions. The following season, he won the title for the second time with Maccabi, but suffered a back injury and had to retire.

International career
Due to his attacking style of play, he was a welcome addition to the Israel national football team, making 32 appearances and scoring three times.

Honours

Club
Beitar Jerusalem
Liga Leumit First Division (1): 1986–87
State Cup (2): 1985, 1989

Maccabi Tel Aviv
Liga Leumit First Division (2): 1991–92, 1994–95
State Cup (1): 1994
Toto Cup (1): 1993

Individual
Israeli Player of the Year (1): 1992

References

External links 
 Maccabi Tel Aviv profile
 

1962 births
Living people
Israeli footballers
Beitar Jerusalem F.C. players
Maccabi Sha'arayim F.C. players
Maccabi Tel Aviv F.C. players
Association football fullbacks
Israel international footballers
Footballers from Jerusalem
Israeli Footballer of the Year recipients